Philippe Adamov (27 June 1956 – 3 February 2020) was a French cartoonist.

Biography
Adamov took up cartooning upon his discovery of the works of Harold Foster and Jijé. After a few months at École Estienne, he worked as a decorator at René Laloux Studios. In 1978, he began drawing, starting with covers of television series Ulysses 31. He began publishing comics in the magazine Okapi in 1983.

The journalist Henri Filippini noticed Adamov's talent and brought him to Glénat Editions. He was now a professional cartoonist. Some of his works from this time include Dayak and L'Impératrice rouge. In 2004, he moved to Éditions Albin Michel and collaborated with novelist Jean-Christophe Grangé to write La Malédiction de Zener.

Philippe Adamov died on 3 February 2020 at the age of 63.

Publications
 Le Vent des dieux (1985–1991)
 Les Eaux de Mortelune (1986–2000)
 Dayak (1993–1997)
 L'Impératrice rouge (1999–2003)
 La Malédiction de Zener (2004–2009)
 Dakota (2012–2016)

References

External links
 Lambiek Comiclopedia article.

1956 births
2020 deaths
French cartoonists
French comics artists
20th-century French illustrators
21st-century French male artists
People from London
Place of death missing